The men's 15 km mass start competition at the Biathlon World Championships 2023 was held on 19 February 2023.

Results
The race was started at 12:30.

References

Men's mass start